The Face Thailand season 2 began audition on 2 August 2015 at Royal Paragon Hall in Siam Paragon in Bangkok. Lukkade Metinee was reprised their roles as coaches again. Bee Namthip and Cris Horwang was the new coach in this season.  was a host replaced Utt Uttsada and Janie Tienphosuwan was a special coach in this season. The show was airing every Saturday 5:25 p.m. to 7:15 p.m..The socond season premiered on 17 October 2015 and ended on 9 January 2016.

The winner of the competition was Kanticha "Ticha" Chumma.

Contestants
(ages stated are at start of filming)

Episodes

Episode 1 : Casting 
First aired 17 October 2015

In the first week is to qualify for all 50 people to shoot and the next natural makeup to steer his team to three Mentor, it was decided by a shoot . Contestants from 50 finalists who had to walk around 39 people . In the second round as a model for screening into three teams, Mentor was the decision by walking and the third round to make up for Mentor selected by a team of around 28 people coming through and finalists 15 people.
Team Lukkade : Tiya, Coco, Natto, Gina, Maprang.
Team Bee :  Linly, Jee, Praew, Jukkoo, Ticha.
Team Cris : Jazzy, Looknam, Namwan, Gwang, June.

Episode 2 : Beauty Shot 
First aired 24 October 2015

 Challenge winner: Jee Phisanphongchana
 Winning coach and team:  Bee Namthip
 Bottom two: Tiya Durmaz & Looknam Kruythong
 Eliminated: Looknam Kruythong

Episode 3 : Screen Test Music Video 
First aired 31 October 2015

 Challenge winner: Gwang Ormsinnoppakul
 Winning coach and team:  Bee Namthip
 Bottom two: Tiya Durmaz & Namwan Wongtanatat
 Eliminated: Namwan Wongtanatat

Episode 4 : Wonderful Pearl Cruise 
First aired 7 November 2015

 Challenge winner: Gwang Ormsinnoppakul
 Winning coach and team:  Lukkade Metinee
 Bottom two: Jee Phisanphongchana & Gwang Ormsinnoppakul
 Eliminated: Jee Phisanphongchana
 Special guest: Cindy Bishop

Episode 5 : Bed Side Story 
First aired 14 November 2015

 Challenge winner: Gwang Ormsinnoppakul
 Winning coach and team:  Lukkade Metinee
 Bottom two: Linly Thongkam & June Tongsumrit
 Eliminated: June Tongsumrit

Episode 6 : The Wedding Day 
First aired 21 November 2015

 Challenge winner: Gwang Ormsinnoppakul
 Winning coach and team:  Cris Horwang
 Bottom three: Praew Naksuwan, Maprang Arunchot & Natto Pongkhan
 Eliminated: Natto Pongkhan
 Guest mentor: Janie Tienphosuwan
 Special guest: Ananda Everingham

Episode 7 : Life is Thrilling 
First aired 28 November 2015

 Challenge winner: Maprang Arunchot
 Winning coach and team:  Lukkade Metinee
 Bottom two: Jazzy Chewter & Praew Naksuwan
 Eliminated: Praew Naksuwan

Episode 8 : Floating Catwalk 
First aired 5 December 2015

 Challenge winner: Jazzy Chewter
 Winning coach and team:  Cris Horwang
 Bottom two: Ticha Chumma & Coco Suparurk
 Eliminated: None

Episode 9 : Make Super Icon Happen 
First aired 12 December 2015

 Challenge winner: Gwang Ormsinnoppakul
 Winning coach and team:  Bee Namthip
 Bottom two: Tiya Durmaz & Gwang Ormsinnoppakul
 Eliminated: Tiya Durmaz
 Special guest: Janie Tienphosuwan

Episode 10 : Underwater Photography 
First aired 19 December 2015

 Challenge winner: Ticha Chumma
 Winning coach and team:  Lukkade Metinee
 Bottom two: Jazzy Chewter & Jukkoo Klinchan
 Eliminated: Jazzy Chewter

Episode 11 : Make Double Look Happen 
First aired 26 December 2015

 Challenge winner: Coco Suparurk
 Winning coach and team:  Lukkade Metinee
 Winning campaign:  Gina Pattarachokchai
 Final three was chosen by Coach: Gwang Ormsinnoppakul, Gina Pattarachokchai & Ticha Chumma
 Fourth final was chosen by coach from winning campaign team: Maprang Arunchot
 Eliminated: Coco Suparurk, Linly Thongkam & Jukkoo Klinchan
 Special guest: Janie Tienphosuwan

Episode 12 : Are You Ready? 
First aired 2 January 2016

In this week's episode reunion special. Looknam and June did not come in this episode.

Episode 13 : Final Walk 

First aired 9 January 2016
 Final four: Gina Pattarachokchai, Maprang Arunchot, Ticha Chumma & Gwang Ormsinnoppakul
 Winning campaign: Ticha Chumma
 Eliminated: Maprang Arunchot
 Final three: Gwang Ormsinnoppakul, Ticha Chumma & Gina Pattarachokchai
 The Face Thailand: Ticha Chumma
 Winning coach and team:  Bee Namthip

Summaries

Elimination Table

 The contestant was part of the winning team for the episode.
 The contestant was at risk of elimination.
 The contestant was eliminated from the competition.
 The contestant won the campaign individually.
 The contestant was a Runner-Up.
 The contestant won The Face.

 Episode 1 was the casting episode. The final fifteen were divided into individual teams of five as they were selected.
 In episode 8, team Cris won the campaign. Lukkade nominated Coco while Bee nominated Ticha for elimination. Cris told both of the girls that she is mentor for the face not only for her team thus she didn't cut both of them. Furthermore, Cris just stole Ticha from Bee to join her team and that moment made her and Bee had the fight.
 In episode 11, Gina won the campaign individually, automatically letting team Lukkade choose another one contestant. Lukkade, Bee and Cris were allowed to choose any of contestant to advance into the finale from the remaining seven models. Lukkade chose Gina, Bee chose Ticha, and Cris chose Gwang. After knowing that team Lukkade won a campaign, Lukkade chose Maprang as a final contestant who then was allowed to do the final runway. Jukkoo, Linly and Coco were eliminated.
 In episode 12, was a reunion with contestants in this season. Looknam and June did not come to this part.
 In episode 13, Ticha won the campaign individually, Ticha, Gina and Gwang were put through to the final runway show while Maprang was eliminated.

Campaigns
 Episode 1: Natural Beauty Shots; Self Administered 'Transformations' (Casting)
 Episode 2: Beauty Shots with animals
 Episode 3: Music Video for "
 Episode 4: Catwalk on Wonderful Pearl Cruise
 Episode 5: Photoshoot "Bed Side Story" with male models
 Episode 6: Obstacle Catwalk on staircase "The Wedding Day"
 Episode 7: Photoshoot "Life is Thrilling"
 Episode 8: Fashion walking on floating catwalk
 Episode 9: Fashion Video for Maybelline: Make Super Icon Happen 
Team Lukkade as Madonna – Vogue
Team Bee as Beyoncé – Crazy In Love
Team Cris as Britney Spears – Baby One More Time
 Episode 10: Photoshoot "Underwater shooting"
 Episode 11: Online advertising for Maybelline Lip Gradation in theme "Make Double Look Happen"
 Episode 13: Acting and Finalwalk

References 

Thailand, 2
The Face Thailand seasons
2015 Thai television seasons
2016 Thai television seasons